Emun Elliott (born 28 November 1983) is a Scottish actor, known for portraying Dr. Christian King in Paradox, Richie in Threesome, John Moray in The Paradise, and Kenny in Guilt.

Background
Elliott was born in 1983 in Edinburgh, Scotland as Emun John Mohammadi. His father is of Persian descent; his mother is Scottish. He was raised in Duddingston, Portobello, Edinburgh, and attended George Heriot's School before beginning a degree in English literature and French at the University of Aberdeen. Dropping out of university after a year, he went on to train at the Royal Scottish Academy of Music and Drama.

Career
Elliott's television credits include Monarch of the Glen, Feel the Force, Afterlife and Paradox, in which he played the lead role of Dr Christian King. He also played Jay Adams in the BBC Three drama Lip Service, and appeared in an episode of Inspector George Gently, and in the crime drama Vera.

Elliott made his film debut in The Clan (2009). He appeared in Black Death (2010) and Strawberry Fields (2011). He has lent his voice to the radio dramas Places in Between and Black Watch.

On stage, Elliott has appeared in Black Watch as Private Fraser, a role he played for two-and-a-half years with the National Theatre of Scotland. In 2010 he played Claudio in a production of Measure for Measure at the Almeida Theatre.

In 2009, Elliott was named as "one to watch" by Screen International.

Elliott starred as Richie, a gay man who gets his friend pregnant, in the Comedy Central sitcom Threesome.. He appeared as charismatic 19th-century department store owner John Moray in the BBC One series The Paradise and played Andrew Brenner in the BBC One drama Trust Me. In 2019, he played Kenny Burns in the BBC Scotland drama Guilt.

Filmography

Television

Film

Theatre

References

External links

1983 births
Alumni of the Royal Conservatoire of Scotland
Alumni of the University of Aberdeen
Living people
Male actors from Edinburgh
People educated at George Heriot's School
Scottish male film actors
Scottish male radio actors
Scottish male stage actors
Scottish male television actors
Scottish people of Iranian descent